John Ringle (October 2, 1848March 15, 1923) was an American businessman and politician who served in the Wisconsin State Assembly and Wisconsin Senate.

Biography
Ringle was born on October 2, 1848, in Herman, Dodge County, Wisconsin. His father, Bartholomew Ringle, had served in the Wisconsin legislature; and his son, Oscar Ringle, would later do so.

Career
Ringle served in the Wisconsin State Assembly in 1879 and from 1894 to 1898. He also served in the Wisconsin Senate from 1882 to 1886. From 1873 to 1878, he was Clerk of Marathon County, Wisconsin. Ringle served as mayor of Wausau in 1884 and 1912. He also served on the Wausau Common Council and the Marathon County, Wisconsin Board of Supervisors. President Grover Cleveland appointed Ringle postmaster of Wausau. Additionally, Ringle was a candidate for State Treasurer of Wisconsin in 1877, losing to Richard W. Guenther, and for the United States House of Representatives from Wisconsin's 9th congressional district in 1886, losing to incumbent Isaac Stephenson. He was a Democrat. Ringle owned a sawmill and the Ringle Brick Company. He was also in the real estate business and in the banking business. He died at his home on March 15, 1923, in Wausau, Wisconsin.

References

People from Herman, Dodge County, Wisconsin
Politicians from Wausau, Wisconsin
American people of German descent
Businesspeople from Wisconsin
County supervisors in Wisconsin
Wisconsin city council members
Mayors of places in Wisconsin
Democratic Party Wisconsin state senators
Democratic Party members of the Wisconsin State Assembly
Wisconsin postmasters
1848 births
1923 deaths